Morwell Recreation Reserve is a multi purpose sport complex located in Morwell, Victoria, Australia. It is the home ground of the Gippsland Power Football Club NAB League team, the Morwell Football Club in the Gippsland Football League, and the Morwell Cricket Club in the Latrobe Valley & District Cricket League.

The stadium, with a maximum capacity of 10,000, has also hosted a series of AFL pre-season matches. In 2014, the stadium hosted a Victorian Football League game between the Collingwood and Richmond reserves. In 2019, the stadium hosted its first regular season AFL Women's game, with Collingwood hosting the Greater Western Sydney in Round 4.

An upgrade to the site by the Latrobe City Council commenced in 2018, and saw the installation of new netball courts, lighting towers, a shared pavilion, and a synthetic playing surface for Australian rules and cricket. The second stage of the upgrade was completed in January 2019.

Attendance records

References

External links

Sports venues in Victoria (Australia)
Australian rules football grounds
AFL Women's grounds
Victorian Football League grounds
Cricket grounds in Australia
Netball venues in Victoria (Australia)
Morwell, Victoria